Johannes Hoffmann may refer to:

 Johannes Hoffmann (CVP) (1890–1967), German politician (CVP)
 Johannes Hoffmann (SPD) (1867–1930), German politician (SPD)
 Johannes Hoffmann (vascular surgeon) (born 1968), German physician
 Johannes Hoffmann von Schweidnitz (1375–1451), Roman Catholic theologian
 Johannes Hoffmann (1844–1920), sculptor

See also
 Johann Hoffmann (disambiguation)